Jairo Velasco Sr. (born 9 May 1947) is a former professional tennis player from Colombia. Velasco has additionally several Senior World Championship titles in different age classes in Singles, Doubles and Mixed doubles.

Career
Velasco teamed with Iván Molina to reach the fourth round of the 1971 French Open, where they were beaten by eventual champions Arthur Ashe and Marty Riessen. In mixed doubles at the 1973 French Open, he and countrywoman Isabel Fernández de Soto lost in the semifinals in three sets to Patrice Dominguez and Betty Stöve. He became the first Colombian to reach the fourth round of the singles draw at a Grand Slam when he beat three players at the 1976 US Open, Ferdi Taygan, Barry Phillips-Moore and Bill Scanlon. His run ended when he lost to Dick Stockton. He remained the only player from his country to go that deep in a Grand Slam tournament until Alejandro Falla made the four round at the 2011 French Open.

The Colombian made seven doubles finals on the Grand Prix tennis circuit, winning two, at Kitzbühel and at home in Bogota. He also made the singles final at Bogota, in 1979, but lost to Víctor Pecci.

He won 24 singles rubbers for the Colombia Davis Cup team, a national record. In all, he participated in 21 ties and won a total of 33 matches, having also been victorious in nine doubles rubbers. He was most notably a member of the side which defeated the United States in the North & Central America Zone final of the 1974 Davis Cup, beating both Harold Solomon and Erik van Dillen in his two singles rubbers. In the Americas Inter-Zonal final, which curiously featured the South African team, Velasco lost his first match to Bob Hewitt and was defeated in the doubles, to surrender the tie. He then beat Ray Moore in a dead rubber. The Colombians, with Velasco in the side, made the Inter-Zonal final again in 1981, but were defeated by Chile.

Personal
Early in his career, Velasco relocated to Barcelona in Spain, where he still lives. He married a woman from the area, and they have three children, including Jairo Velasco Jr., a doubles specialist on the ATP Tour and Gabriela Velasco Andreu, who has been in the world's top 400.

Grand Prix career finals

Singles: 1 (0–1)

Doubles: 7 (2–5)

Challenger titles

Singles: 3

Doubles: 1

Notes

References

External links
 
 

1947 births
Living people
Colombian male tennis players
Colombian expatriate sportspeople in Spain
Sportspeople from Bogotá
20th-century Colombian people